Lake Superior State Forest is a state forest in the Upper Peninsula of Michigan.  It is operated by the Michigan Department of Natural Resources.  The North Country Trail utilizes this state forest for 43 miles (69 km) of its route.

The Lake Superior forest region was one of the last areas in Michigan to be logged for old-growth Red Pine and White Pine.  Logging continued into the 1910s. Much of the sandy, cut-over land was seen as worthless and was allowed to revert to the state of Michigan in lieu of unpaid property taxes.  The state reorganized these parcels of property as the Lake Superior State Forest.

External links
 Michigan Department of Natural Resources

Protected areas of Luce County, Michigan
Michigan state forests